Johann George Schmidt or Johann Georg(e) Schmi(e)d (1707, Fürstenwalde bei Geising - 24 July 1774, Dresden) was a German architect of the Dresden Baroque.  He was brother-in-law, student and successor of George Bähr.

Work 
He became well known for his building, in the reconstruction of Dresden after the Seven Years' War. The new church at the Schloss Weesenstein is also attributed to him.

External links 
 Sächsische biography

1707 births
1774 deaths
18th-century German architects
People from Altenberg, Saxony
Architects from Saxony